Manasi is a 1981 romantic comedy Oriya film directed by Malay Mitra.

Plot 
Akash (Sriram Panda) is the son of industrialist Surendra Das and looks after his father's business. He and Prashant (Swarup Naik), who is an engineer by profession  are close friends. One day Akash's family visit Seema's (Saudamini Misra) family at a function held by Seema's father. Seema mistaken Akash as a driver and Prashant as Akash. Seema's friend Surekha falls in love with Prashant alias Akash. Evantually Seema falls in love with Akash alias the driver. Situation becomes tense, when Akash's family want the marriage of Akash with Seema. At last the confusion is resolved and Seema finds out the identity of the driver and pseudo Akash is Prashant.

Cast
Sriram Panda....Akash		
Saudamini Misra... Seema	
Tripura Misra .... Surekha		
Swarup Naik ..... Prashant
Samuel Sahu ..... Surendra Das	
Geeta Rao.... Akash's mother	
 Radha Panda ...Banchanidhi
Shyamalendu Bhatacharjee... Servant	
Drulabh Singh ... Seema's father

Soundtrack

References

External links 
 

1981 films
1980s Odia-language films